The Mental Rotations Test is a test of spatial ability by Steven G. Vandenberg and Allan R. Kuse, first published in 1978. It has been used in hundreds of studies since then.

A meta-analysis of studies using this test showed that men performed better than women with no changes seen by birth cohort. A close analysis of subjects taking the test revealed that humans do not only rely on spatial imagery to solve the puzzles, but also involve more complex strategies.

References 

Intelligence tests
1978 introductions